Ministry Watch is an independent American evangelical Christian organization whose purpose is to review Protestant ministries for financial accountability and transparency, and to provide independent advice to Protestants considering making donations to them.

Background
Ministry Watch is an independent evangelical Christian organization whose mission is to bring transparency, accountability, and credibility to the Christian ministry marketplace.

The organization publishes investigative reports and “accountability journalism” at its website.  It also has a database of approximately 1000 Christian ministries.  That database includes five years of financial information, as well as ratings for Financial Efficiency and Transparency.

It also publishes a bulletin of "shining light ministries" which includes a list of exemplary ministries, and a bulletin of "donor alerts" concerning potential frauds and pitfalls for donors. 

MinistryWatch has been featured often in the media.  It was started by Howard "Rusty" Leonard. Leonard and Ministry Watch was featured as a watchdog on ABC News 20/20 in 2007 about various groups' usage of donors' money.  Since then, Leonard and the current president Warren Cole Smith have appeared in The Washington Post, NPR, WORLD Magazine, Christianity Today, Religion News Service, Bloomberg, and many other secular and Christian media outlets.

References

External links
 WallWatchers website

Evangelical organizations
Charity review websites
Christian organizations established in 2000
American review websites